The 1977 European Cup Winners' Cup Final was a football match contested between Hamburger SV of West Germany and the defending champions, Anderlecht of Belgium. It was the final match of the 1976–77 European Cup Winners' Cup tournament and the 17th European Cup Winners' Cup final in history. The final was held at Olympisch Stadion in Amsterdam, Netherlands (the venue was decided in Bern by the UEFA Executive Committee on 17 September 1976). Hamburg won the match 2–0 thanks to goals by Georg Volkert and Felix Magath.

Route to the final

Match details

See also
R.S.C. Anderlecht in European football

References

External links
UEFA Cup Winners' Cup results at Rec.Sport.Soccer Statistics Foundation
1977 European Cup Winners' Cup Final at UEFA.com

3
Hamburger SV matches
R.S.C. Anderlecht matches
International club association football competitions hosted by the Netherlands
1977
1976–77 in Belgian football
1976–77 in German football
1976–77 in Dutch football
May 1977 sports events in Europe
European Cup Winners' Cup Final, 1977
1970s in Amsterdam